Andrew Richard Gray Jr. (born April 12, 1988) is a Canadian soccer player who plays for Vaughan Azzurri as a winger.

Career
Gray began his career in Sweden with fifth-tier side Juventus IF in 2012. He had spells with Ventura County Fusion, OPS and FC Haka, before signing with United Soccer League side Orange County Blues on August 4, 2016.

References

External links

1988 births
Living people
Association football midfielders
Canadian soccer players
Canadian people of Jamaican descent
Canadian expatriate soccer players
Expatriate footballers in Sweden
Canadian expatriate sportspeople in Sweden
Expatriate footballers in Finland
Canadian expatriate sportspeople in Finland
Expatriate soccer players in the United States
Canadian expatriate sportspeople in the United States
St. Francis Xavier X-Men soccer players
Victoria Highlanders players
Ventura County Fusion players
Oulun Palloseura players
FC Haka players
Orange County SC players
Phoenix Rising FC players
USL League Two players
Ykkönen players
USL Championship players
League1 Ontario players
Canada men's youth international soccer players
Vaughan Azzurri players
Sheridan College alumni
Soccer players from Brampton